During the 1996–97 English football season, Watford F.C. competed in the Football League Second Division.

Season summary
In the 1996–97 season, although Jackett oversaw a long unbeaten stretch of results, Watford were unable to mount a serious promotion challenge and finished a disappointing campaign in 13th place – Watford's lowest position in the league structure since the 1970s. During the close season, Jackett was demoted to the position of first-team coach, with Graham Taylor once again becoming manager.

Final league table

Results
Watford's score comes first

Legend

Football League Second Division

FA Cup

League Cup

Football League Trophy

Players

First-team squad
Squad at end of season

Left club during season

Reserve squad

References

Notes

Watford F.C. seasons
Watford